The 2008 All-Ireland Senior Football Championship Final was the 121st All-Ireland Final and the deciding match of the 2008 All-Ireland Senior Football Championship, an inter-county Gaelic football tournament for the top teams in Ireland.

Background
Kerry and Tyrone defined the decade. Since 2000, they had hoovered up titles in 2000, 2004, 2006, 2007 (Kerry) and 2003, 2005 (Tyrone). This led to Martin Breheny calling the 2008 final the "most decade-defining clash since Dublin v Kerry in the late 1970s".

2008 was the first final between two teams who had been beaten in their Provincial Championship. Kerry were reigning champions and were gunning for three-in-a-row. Tyrone had looked dead and buried after being knocked out of their Ulster quarter-final by Down after extra-time in a replay but had bounced back through the back door.

Tyrone had beaten Wexford in their semi-final, while Kerry had beaten Cork after a replay in their semi-final.

Match summary
Tyrone beat Kerry by four points to claim their third All-Ireland title.

References

All-Ireland Senior Football Championship Final
All-Ireland Senior Football Championship Final
All-Ireland Senior Football Championship Final, 2008
All-Ireland Senior Football Championship Final
All-Ireland Senior Football Championship Finals
Kerry county football team matches
Tyrone county football team matches